Maasilamani may refer to:

 Maasilamani, a 2009 Indian Tamil-language action comedy film
 A. B. Masilamani (1914–1990), Pastor from India